The phonology of Portuguese varies among dialects, in extreme cases leading to some difficulties in intelligibility. Portuguese is a pluricentric language and has some of the most diverse sound variations in any language. This article on phonology focuses on the pronunciations that are generally regarded as standard. Since Portuguese is a pluricentric language—and differences between European Portuguese (EP), Brazilian Portuguese (BP), and Angolan Portuguese (AP) can be considerable—varieties are distinguished whenever necessary.

One of the most salient differences between the European and Brazilian dialects is their prosody. European Portuguese is a stress-timed language, with reduction, devoicing or even deletion of unstressed vowels, and a general tolerance of syllable-final consonants. Brazilian Portuguese, on the other hand, is of mixed characteristics, and varies according to the speech rate, dialect, and gender of the speaker.

Brazilian Portuguese disallows some closed syllables: coda nasals are deleted with concomitant nasalization of the preceding vowel, even in learned words; coda  becomes , except for conservative velarization at the extreme south and rhotacism in remote rural areas in the center of the country; the coda rhotic is usually deleted entirely when word-final, especially in verbs in the infinitive form; and /i/ can be epenthesized after almost all other coda-final consonants. This tends to produce words almost entirely composed of open syllables, e.g., magma . In European Portuguese, similarly, epenthesis may occur with [ɨ], as in magma  and afta .

Consonants
The consonant inventory of Portuguese is fairly conservative. These changes are known as deaffrication. Other than this, there have been no other significant changes to the consonant phonemes since Old Portuguese. However, several consonant phonemes have special allophones at syllable boundaries (often varying quite significantly between European and Brazilian Portuguese), and a few also undergo allophonic changes at word boundaries. Henceforward, the phrase "at the end of a syllable" can be understood as referring to a position before a consonant or at the end of a word.

Phonetic notes
 Semivowels contrast with unstressed high vowels in verbal conjugation, as in (eu) rio  'I laugh' and (ele) riu  'he (has) laughed.'  Phonologists debate whether their nature is vowel or consonant. In intervocalic position semivowels are ambisyllabic, they are associated to both the previous syllable and the following syllable onset.
 The consonant hereafter denoted as  has a variety of realizations depending on dialect. In Europe, it is typically a voiced uvular fricative . There is also a realization as a voiceless uvular fricative , and the original pronunciation as an alveolar trill  also remains very common in various dialects. A common realization of the word-initial  in the Lisbon accent is a voiced uvular fricative trill . In Brazil,  can be velar, uvular, or glottal and may be voiceless unless between voiced sounds; it is usually pronounced as a voiceless velar fricative , a voiceless glottal fricative  or voiceless uvular fricative . See also Guttural R in Portuguese.
Very few northeastern Portugal dialects still maintain the medieval distinction between apical and laminal sibilants (written s/ss and c/ç/z, respectively).

 As phonemes,  and  occur only in loanwords (e.g. tchau and dee jay), with a tendency for speakers to substitute into fricatives in Portugal.
 Many young Timorese do not have the distinct /ʒ/ phoneme and use the sequence [z] and [dʒ], making zoológico and vigésimo homophones.
 In large parts of northern Portugal, e.g.

Consonant elision
There is a variation in the pronunciation of the first consonant of certain clusters, most commonly C or P in cç, ct, pç and pt. These consonants may be variably elided or conserved. For some words, this variation may exist inside a country, sometimes in all of them; for others, the variation is dialectal, with the consonant being always pronounced in one country and always elided in the other. This variation affects 0.5% of the language's vocabulary, or 575 words out of 110,000. In most cases, Brazilians variably conserve the consonant while speakers elsewhere have invariably ceased to pronounce it (for example, detector in Brazil versus detetor in Portugal). The inverse situation is rarer, occurring in words such as fa(c)to and conta(c)to (consonants never pronounced in Brazil, pronounced elsewhere). Until 2009, this reality could not be apprehended from the spelling: while Brazilians did not write consonants that were no longer pronounced, the spelling of the other countries retained them in many words as silent letters, usually when there was still a vestige of their presence in the pronunciation of the preceding vowel. This could give the false impression that European Portuguese was phonologically more conservative in this aspect, when in fact it was Brazilian Portuguese that retained more consonants in pronunciation.

Consonant phonotactics 
Syllables have the maximal structure of (C)(C)V(C).

 The consonants  and  only occur in the middle of a word between vowels, and only rarely occur before .
 Although nasal consonants do not normally occur at the end of syllables, syllable-final  may be present in rare learned words, such as abdomen ( 'abdomen'). In Brazilian varieties, these words have a nasal diphthong (spelled as abdomen). Word-initial  occurs in very few loanwords.
 While the sibilant consonants contrast word-initially and intervocalically, they appear in complementary distribution in the syllable coda. For many dialects (i.e., those of Portugal and of Rio de Janeiro and the northeast of Brazil and certain other areas in Brazil), the sibilant is a postalveolar in coda position (e.g., pasto  'pasture'; futurismo  'futurism'; paz  'peace'). In many other dialects of Brazil (e.g., some of the Southeast, Northeast, and North), the postalveolar variant occurs in some or all cases when directly preceding a consonant, including across word boundaries, but not word-finally (e.g.). In a number of Brazilian dialects, this "palatalization" is absent entirely (e.g.). In the vast majority of dialects, however, word-final "s" and "z" are pronounced /z/ before vowels (e.g. os ovos , "the eggs", temos hoje , "we have today", faz isso , "do that"). In European dialects, the postalveolar fricatives are only weakly fricated in the syllable coda.
The consonant  is velarized  in all positions in European Portuguese, even before front vowels. In Portugal, the unvelarized lateral appears only in non-standard dialects. In some caipira registers, there is a rhotacism of coda  to retroflex .
For speakers who realize  as an alveolar trill , the sequence  (as in e.g., os rins) can coalesce into a voiced alveolar fricative trill .
The semivowels  and  do not occur before  and  respectively, and only contrast in some diphthongs like in pai  versus pau .
Unlike its neighbor and relative Spanish, Brazilian Portuguese lacks a tendency to elide any stop, including those that may become a continuant (always fricative in Portuguese) by lenition ( > ,  > ,  > ), but it has a number of allophones to it.

Rhotics
The two rhotic phonemes  and  contrast only between oral vowels, similar to Spanish. Elsewhere, their occurrence is predictable by context, with dialectal variations in realization. The rhotic is "hard" (i.e.) in the following circumstances:
Word-initially (e.g., rosa 'rose');
Following a nasal vowel (e.g., honrar 'to honor');
In most Brazilian and some African dialects, syllable-finally (i.e., preceded but not followed by a vowel);
When written with the digraph "rr" (e.g., carro 'car').
It is "soft" (i.e.) when it occurs in syllable onset clusters (e.g., atributo), and written as a single 'r' between vowels (e.g., dirigir 'to drive')

The realization of the "hard" rhotic  varies significantly across dialects.

This restricted variation has prompted several authors to postulate a single rhotic phoneme.  and  see the soft as the unmarked realization and that instances of intervocalic  result from gemination and a subsequent deletion rule (i.e., carro  >  > ). Similarly,  argue that the hard is the unmarked realization.

Brazilian rhotics
A "soft" allophone  in syllable-onset clusters, as described above;
A default "hard" allophone in most other circumstances;
In some dialects, a special allophone syllable-finally (i.e., preceded but not followed by a vowel);
Commonly in all dialects, deletion of the rhotic word-finally.

The default hard allophone is some sort of voiceless fricative in most dialects, e.g., although other variants are also found. For example, a trill  is found in certain conservative dialects down São Paulo, of Italian-speaking, Spanish-speaking, Arabic-speaking, or Slavic-speaking influence. The other trill  is found in areas of German-speaking, French-speaking, and Portuguese-descended influence throughout coastal Brazil down Espírito Santo, most prominently Rio de Janeiro.

The syllable-final allophone shows the greatest variation:
Many dialects (mainly in Brasília, Minas Gerais and Brazilian North and Northeast) use the same voiceless fricative as in the default allophone.  This may become voiced before a voiced consonant, esp. in its weaker variants (e.g., dormir  'to sleep').
The soft  occurs for many speakers in Southern Brazil and São Paulo city.
An English-like approximant  or vowel (R-colored vowel) occurs elsewhere in São Paulo as well as Mato Grosso do Sul, southern Goiás, central and southern Mato Grosso and bordering regions of Minas Gerais, as well as in the urban areas in the Sinos river valley. This pronunciation is stereotypically associated with the rural "caipira" dialect.

Throughout Brazil, deletion of the word-final rhotic is common, regardless of the "normal" pronunciation of the syllable-final allophone.  This pronunciation is particularly common in lower registers, although found in most registers in some areas, e.g., Northeast Brazil, and in the more formal and standard sociolect. It occurs especially in verbs, which always end in R in their infinitive form; in words other than verbs, the deletion is rarer and seems not to occur in monosyllabic non-verb words, such as mar. Evidence of this allophone is often encountered in writing that attempts to approximate the speech of communities with this pronunciation, e.g., the rhymes in the popular poetry (cordel literature) of the Northeast and phonetic spellings (e.g., amá, sofrê in place of amar, sofrer) in Jorge Amado's novels (set in the Northeast) and Gianfrancesco Guarnieri's play Eles não usam black tie (about favela dwellers in Rio de Janeiro).

The soft realization is often maintained across word boundaries in close syntactic contexts (e.g., mar azul  'blue sea').

Vowels

Portuguese has one of the richest vowel phonologies of all Romance languages, having both oral and nasal vowels, diphthongs, and triphthongs. A phonemic distinction is made between close-mid vowels  and the open-mid vowels , as in Italian, Catalan and French, though there is a certain amount of vowel alternation. European Portuguese has also two central vowels, one of which tends to be elided like the e caduc of French.

The central closed vowel  only occurs in European Portuguese when e is unstressed, e.g. presidente , as well as in Angola; where unlike Portugal, it only occurs in final syllables, e.g. presidente . However,  does not exist in Brazil, e.g. presidente .

The nasal  becomes open .

Vowel classification 
The dialects of Portugal are characterized by reducing vowels to a greater extent than others.

European Portuguese possesses quite a wide range of vowel allophones:
 All vowels are lowered and retracted before .
 All vowels are raised and advanced before alveolar, palato-alveolar and palatal consonants.
 Word-finally,  is voiceless.

The exact realization of the  varies somewhat amongst dialects. In European Portuguese, the general situation is similar, except that in some regions the two vowels form minimal pairs in some European dialects. In central European Portuguese this contrast occurs in a limited morphological context, namely in verbs conjugation between the first person plural present and past perfect indicative forms of verbs such as pensamos ('we think') and pensámos ('we thought'; spelled  in Brazil). It means that in falamos 'we speak' there is the expected prenasal -raising: , while in falámos 'we spoke' there are phonologically two  in crasis:  (but in Brazil both merge, falamos ). Close-mid vowels and open-mid vowels ( and ) contrast only when they are stressed. In unstressed syllables, they occur in complementary distribution.

According to Mateus and d'Andrade (2000:19), in European Portuguese, the stressed  only occurs in the following three contexts:
 Before a palatal consonant (such as telha )
 Before the palatal front glide (such as lei )
 Before a nasal consonant (such as cama )

European Portuguese "e caduc" 
European Portuguese possesses a near-close near-back unrounded vowel, transcribed  in this article. It occurs in unstressed syllables such as in pegar  ('to grip').

When "e" is surrounded by another vowel, it becomes ; e.g. real .
 Regardless of the underlying phoneme, phonetic  can be elided, affecting syllabification and sometimes even producing a syllabic consonant; e.g. verdade  → , perigo  → , estado  → , energia  → , ministro  → , príncipe  → , artilhar  → , caminhar  → , pistola  →  (here,  stands for a syllabic alveolar trill with one contact, the syllabic counterpart of ). As in the last example, this can result in complex syllable onsets that are typical of Slavic languages.
, a phonological sonorant, behaves like an obstruent in this case and can also be devoiced in voiceless clusters, as in reconhecer  'to recognize' (phonemically ).

There are very few minimal pairs for this sound: some examples include pregar  ('to nail') vs. pregar  ('to preach'; the latter stemming from earlier preegar < Latin praedicāre), sê  ('be!') vs. sé  ('see/cathedral') vs. se  ('if'), and pêlo  ('hair') vs. pélo  ('I peel off') vs. pelo  ('for the'), after orthographic changes, all these three words are now spelled pelo.

Oral diphthongs
Diphthongs are not considered independent phonemes in Portuguese, but knowing them can help with spelling and pronunciation.

There are also some words with two vowels occurring next to each other like in iate and sábio may be pronounced both as rising diphthongs or hiatus.

At least in European Portuguese, the diphthongs  tend to have more central second elements  – note that the latter semivowel is also more weakly rounded than the vowel . In the Lisbon accent, the diphthong  often has an onset that is more back than central, i.e.  or even .

Nasal vowels

Portuguese also has a series of nasalized vowels.  analyzes European Portuguese with five monophthongs and five diphthongs, all phonemic: . Nasal diphthongs occur mostly at the end of words (or followed by a final sibilant), and in a few compounds.

As in French, the nasal consonants represented by the letters ⟨m n⟩ are deleted in coda position, and in that case the preceding vowel becomes phonemically nasal, e.g. in genro  ('son-in-law'). But a nasal consonant subsists when it is followed by a plosive, e.g. in cantar  ('to sing'). Vowel nasalization has also been observed non-phonemically as result of coarticulation, before heterosyllabic nasal consonants, e.g. in soma  ('sum'). Hence, one speaks discriminatingly of nasal vowels (i.e. phonemically so) and nasalized vowels. Additionally, a nasal monophthong  written ⟨ã⟩ exists independently of these processes, e.g. in romã  ('pomegranate'). Brazilian Portuguese is seen as being more nasal than European Portuguese due to the presence of these nasalized vowels. Some linguists consider them to be a result of external influences, including the common language spoken at Brazil's coast at time of discovery, Tupi.

The  and  distinction does not happen in nasal vowels; ⟨em om⟩ are pronounced as close-mid.

(Here  means a velar nasal approximant.) At the end of a word ⟨em⟩ is always pronounced  with a clear nasal palatal approximant (see below). Whenever a nasal vowel is pronounced with a nasal coda (approximant or occlusive) the (phonetic) nasalization of the vowel itself is optional.

The following examples exhaustively demonstrate the general situation for BP.
 romã ('pomegranate') :  : final vowel is (phonemically) "nasal" and nasal approximants may not be pronounced.
 cem ('a hundred') :  : nasal approximant must be pronounced.
 cantar ('to sing') : : nasal consonant remains because of the following plosive; preceding vowel is raised and nasalized non-phonemically. (This is traditionally considered a "nasal" vowel by textbooks.)
 cano ('pipe') :  or  : first vowel is necessarily raised, and may be nasalized non-phonemically.
 tomo ('I take') :  or  : first vowel may be nasalized non-phonemically.

It follows from these observations that the vowels of BP can be described simply in the following way.
BP has eight monophthongs——whose phonetic realizations may be affected by a nasal archiphoneme . The vowel  is typically nasalized (in every position), but this is not phonemic.
All eight vowels are differentiated in stressed and unstressed positions. In this position,  has a free variation  and this fatally impairs  distinction. (For instance: the word ímã ('magnet') is effectively pronounced as either ima or ímam, depending on speaker.)
Like the ん of Japanese, the archiphoneme  is a nasal archiphoneme of syllabic codas and its actual place of articulation is determined by the following sound:
=;
=;
=;
otherwise it becomes a nasal approximant  (as in Japanese kan'i  [かんい], etc.).
The system of eight monophthongs reduces to five——before  and also in stressed syllables before heterosyllabic nasal consonants.
(Here  means the same phoneme that ⟨nh⟩ represents; and  may be nasalized non-phonemically.)
With this description, the examples from before are simply . But there is no commonly accepted transcription for Brazilian Portuguese phonology.

Vowel nasalization in some dialects of Brazilian Portuguese is very different from that of French, for example. In French, the nasalization extends uniformly through the entire vowel, whereas in the Southern-Southeastern dialects of Brazilian Portuguese, the nasalization begins almost imperceptibly and then becomes stronger toward the end of the vowel. In this respect it is more similar to the nasalization of Hindi-Urdu (see Anusvara).

 banco 
 tempo 
 pinta 
 sombra 
 mundo 
 fã 
 bem 
 vim 
 bom 
 um 
 mãe 
 pão 
 põe 
 muito

Nasal diphthongs

Most times nasal diphthongs occur at the end of the word. They are:

 -ãe . It occurs in mãe(s) ('mother[s]') and in the plural of some words ending in -ão, e.g., cães ('dogs'), pães ('breads'); and exceptionally non-finally in cãibra ('cramp'). In Central European Portuguese, it occurs also in all words ending in -em, like tem ('he/she/it has'), bem ('well', 'good', as a noun), mentem (they lie), etc.
 -em . It occurs, both stressed and unstressed, in Brazilian Portuguese and in European Portuguese (northern and southern dialects) in word-final syllables ending in -em and -ém like bem, sem, além, as well as in verbs ending in -em (3rd person plural present indicative or verbs in -er and -ir).
 -õe . It occurs:
 in the present indicative of pôr and its derivatives; in the 2nd person singular (pões , opões, compões, pressupões), in the 3rd person singular (põe , opõe etc.), and non-finally in the 3rd person plural (põem , opõem etc.).
in the plural of many words ending in-ão, e.g., limões ('lemons'), anões ('dwarfs'), espiões ('spies'), iões ('ions'), catiões ('cations'), aniões ('anions'), eletrões ('electrons'), neutrões ('neutrons'), protões ('protons'), fotões ('photons'), positrões ('positrons') and the plurals of all words with the suffix -ção (compare English -tion, like in communication), like comunicações ('communications'), provocações ('provocations').
 -uim or -uin  Example: pinguim ('penguin').
 ui  occurs only in the words muito  and the uncommon mui . The nasalisation here may be interpreted as allophonic, bleeding over from the previous m (compare mãe with the same bleeding of nasality).
 -ão or -am. . Examples: pão ('bread'), cão ('dog'), estão ('they are'), vão ('they go'), limão ('lemon'), órgão ('organ'), Estêvão ('Steven'). When in the -am form (unstressed) they are always the 3rd person of the plural of a verb, like estavam ('they were'), contam ('they account'), escreveram ('they wrote'), partiram ('they left').
 -om . It occurs in word-final syllables ending in -om like bom and som. However, it may be algo monophthongized [õ].

At least in European Portuguese, the final elements of the diphthongs are normally undershot: , with  being not only more central but also more weakly rounded than the stressed instances of the phoneme . This is not transcribed in this article.

Vowel alternation
The stressed relatively open vowels  contrast with the stressed relatively close vowels  in several kinds of grammatically meaningful alternation:

 Between the base form of a noun or adjective and its inflected forms: ovo  ('egg'), ovos  ('eggs'); novo , nova , novos , novas  ('new': masculine singular, feminine singular, masculine plural, feminine plural);
 Between some nouns or adjectives and related verb forms: adj. seco  ('dry'), v. seco  ('I dry'); n. gosto  ('taste'), v. gosto  ('I like'); n. governo  ('government') v. governo  ('I govern');
 Between different forms of some verbs: pôde  ('he could'), pode  ('he can');
 Between some pairs of related words: avô  ('grandfather'), avó  ('grandmother');
 Some stem-changing verbs alternate stressed high vowels with stressed low vowels in the present tense, according to a regular pattern: cedo, cedes, cede, cedem ; movo, moves, move, movem  (present indicative); ceda, cedas, ceda, cedam ; mova, movas, mova, movam  (present subjunctive). (There is another class of stem-changing verbs which alternate  with  according to the same scheme);
 In central Portugal, the 1st. person plural of verbs of the 1st. conjugation (with infinitives in -ar) has the stressed vowel  in the present indicative, but  in the preterite, cf. pensamos ('we think') with pensámos ('we thought').

There are also pairs of unrelated words that differ in the height of these vowels, such as besta  ('beast') and besta  ('crossbow'); mexo  ('I move') and mecho  ('I highlight [hair]'); molho  ('sauce') and molho  ('bunch'); corte  ('cut') and corte  ('court'); meta  ('I put' subjunctive) and meta  ('goal'); and (especially in Portugal) para  ('for') and para  ('he stops'); forma  ('mold') and forma  ('shape').

There are several minimal pairs in which a clitic containing the vowel  contrasts with a monosyllabic stressed word containing : da vs. dá, mas vs. más, a vs. à , etc.

Unstressed vowels
Some isolated vowels (meaning those that are neither nasal nor part of a diphthong) tend to change quality in a fairly predictable way when they become unstressed. In the examples below, the stressed syllable of each word is in boldface. The term "final" should be interpreted here as at the end of a word or before word-final -s.

* N.E.: The bold syllable is the stressed, but the pronunciation indicated on the left is for the unstressed syllable – not bold.

With a few exceptions mentioned in the previous sections, the vowels  and  occur in complementary distribution when stressed, the latter before nasal consonants followed by a vowel, and the former elsewhere.

The three unstressed vowels  are reduced and often voiceless or elided in fast speech.

Which makes it almost similar to Brazilian Portuguese (except by final , which is inherited from European Portuguese).

There are some exceptions to the rules above. Also,  or  appear in some unstressed syllables in EP, being marked in the lexicon, like espetáculo (spectacle) ; these occur from deletion of the final consonant in a closed syllable and from crasis. And there is some dialectal variation in the unstressed sounds: the northern and eastern accents of BP have low vowels in unstressed syllables, instead of the high vowels . However, the Brazilian media tends to prefer the southern pronunciation. In any event, the general paradigm is a useful guide for pronunciation and spelling.

Epenthesis 
In BP, an epenthetic vowel  is sometimes inserted between consonants, to break up consonant clusters that are not native to Portuguese, in learned words and in borrowings. This also happens at the ends of words after consonants that cannot occur word-finally (e.g.).  For example, psicologia ('psychology') may be pronounced ; adverso ('adverse') may be pronounced ; McDonald's may be pronounced . In northern Portugal, an epenthetic  may be used instead, but in southern Portugal there is often no epenthesis, .  Epenthesis at the end of a word does not normally occur in Portugal.

Some examples: flagrante , complexo , fixo  (but not ficção ), latex , quatro , guaxinim ,

Further notes on the oral vowels

This can affect spelling: cf. EP tónico, BP tônico "tonic".
In most BP, stressed vowels have nasal allophones, etc. In São Paulo, Southern Brazil, and EP, nasalization is nearly absent in this environment, other than in compounds such as connosco, comummente (spelled conosco, comumente in BP).
(sometimes ), before a sibilant coda (written s or z). For instance, Jesus  ('Jesus'), faz  ('he does'), dez  ('ten'). This has led to the use of meia (from meia dúzia 'half a dozen") instead of seis  ('six') when making enumerations, to avoid any confusion with três  ('three') on the telephone.

Sandhi

When two words belonging to the same phrase are pronounced together, or two morphemes are joined in a word, the last sound in the first may be affected by the first sound of the next (sandhi), either coalescing with it, or becoming shorter (a semivowel), or being deleted.

Consonant sandhi
As was mentioned above, the dialects of Portuguese can be divided into two groups, according to whether syllable-final sibilants are pronounced as postalveolar consonants ,  or as alveolar , . At the end of words, the default pronunciation for a sibilant is voiceless, but in connected speech the sibilant is treated as though it were within a word (assimilation):

When two identical sibilants appear in sequence within a word, they reduce to a single consonant. But if the two sibilants are different they may be pronounced separately, depending on the dialect. This applies also to words that are pronounced together in connected speech:
 sibilant + , e.g., as sopas: either  (most of Brazil);  (Portugal, standard)
 sibilant + , e.g., as zonas: either  (mostly in Brazil);  (Portugal, standard)

Vowel sandhi
If the next word begins with a similar vowel, they merge with it in connected speech, producing a single vowel, possibly long (crasis). Here, "similar" means that nasalization can be disregarded, and that the two central vowels  can be identified with each other. Thus,

The open nasalized  appears only in this environment.
  → ; fila de espera  ('waiting line') (EP only).

If the next word begins with a dissimilar vowel, then  and  become approximants in Brazilian Portuguese (synaeresis):

  + V → ; durante o curso  ('during the course'), mais que um  ('more than one').
  + V → ; todo este tempo  ('all this time') do objeto  ('of the object').

In careful speech and in with certain function words, or in some phrase stress conditions (see Mateus and d'Andrade, for details), European Portuguese has a similar process:

  + V → ; se a vires  ('if you see her'), mais que um  ('more than one').
  + V → ; todo este tempo  ('all this time'), do objeto  ('of the object').

 durante o curso  ('during the course'), este inquilino  ('this tenant').
 todo este tempo  ('all this time'), disto há muito  ('there's a lot of this').

Aside from historical set contractions formed by prepositions plus determiners or pronouns, like à/dà, ao/do, nesse, dele, etc., on one hand and combined clitic pronouns such as mo/ma/mos/mas (it/him/her/them to/for me), and so on, on the other, Portuguese spelling does not reflect vowel sandhi. In poetry, however, an apostrophe may be used to show elision such as in d'água.

Stress
Primary stress may fall on any of the three final syllables of a word, but mostly on the last two. There is a partial correlation between the position of the stress and the final vowel; for example, the final syllable is usually stressed when it contains a nasal phoneme, a diphthong, or a close vowel. The orthography of Portuguese takes advantage of this correlation to minimize the number of diacritics.

Practically, for the main stress pattern, words that end with: "a(s)", "e(s)", "o(s)", "em(ens)" and "am" are stressed in the penultimate syllable, and those that don't carry these endings are stressed in the last syllable. In the case a word doesn't follow this pattern, it takes an accent according to Portuguese's accentuation rules (these rules might not be followed everytime when concerning personal names and non-integrated loanwords).

Because of the phonetic changes that often affect unstressed vowels, pure lexical stress is less common in Portuguese than in related languages, but there is still a significant number of examples of it:

 dúvida  'doubt' vs. duvida  's/he doubts'
 ruíram  'they collapsed' vs. ruirão  'they will collapse'
falaram  'they spoke' vs. falarão  'they will speak' (Brazilian pronunciation)
ouve  'he hears' vs. ouvi   'I heard' (Brazilian pronunciation)
túnel  'tunnel' vs. tonel  'wine cask' (European pronunciation)

Prosody

Tone is not lexically significant in Portuguese, but phrase- and sentence-level tones are important. As in most Romance languages, interrogation on yes-no questions is expressed mainly by sharply raising the tone at the end of the sentence. An exception to this is the word oi that is subject to meaning changes: an exclamation tone means 'hi/hello', and in an interrogative tone it means 'I didn't understand'.

Phonological comparison

Sample
Os Lusíadas, Luís de Camões (I, 33)

See also
Differences between Spanish and Portuguese
History of Portuguese
Portuguese orthography, for further information on spelling
Portuguese dialects
Portuguese alphabet

References

Bibliography

External links 
 Omniglot's page on Portuguese Includes a recording of the phonemes and diphthongs (Brazilian Portuguese).
 The pronunciation of the Portuguese of Portugal
 Phoneme summary, with samples
 The pronunciation of each vowel and consonant letter in European Portuguese

Phonology, Portugues
Italic phonologies

he:פורטוגזית#הגייה וכתיבה